Scott Brian Fitzgerald (born 13 August 1969) is a football coach and former professional player, who is academy director at Millwall.

As a player, he was a defender who notably played in the Premier League for Wimbledon and in the Football League for Sheffield United, Millwall, Colchester United and Brentford. He was capped at Republic of Ireland U21 and B team level.

After retiring he began his career in coaching, heading the youth teams at Brentford, Gillingham and Millwall. He had a spell as a first team manager at Brentford during the 2006–07 season. Fitzgerald is currently academy director at Millwall.

Club career

Wimbledon
A central defender, Fitzgerald signed a professional contract with First Division club Wimbledon at the start of the 1987–88 season, but did not make his debut for nearly three years, when he came on as a substitute against Tottenham Hotspur on 28 April 1990. He did not play again until the 1991–92 season, when he played made 36 First Division appearances and scored his first goal for the club. Fitzgerald made 20 appearances during the inaugural Premier League season and then made 28 appearances during the 1993–94 campaign.

Fitzgerald made only 17 appearances during the 1994–95 season and lost his place in the team during 1995–96, making only four appearances. He failed to appear at all during the 1996–97 season and left the Dons in July 1997. Fitzgerald made 125 appearances and scored one goal during his decade as a professional with Wimbledon.

Fitzgerald moved to First Division club Sheffield United on loan 23 November 1995 and made six appearances.

Millwall
Fitzgerald joined Second Division club Millwall on a one-month loan on 11 October 1996, making seven appearances before his loan expired. He returned to the Lions for a second one-month loan on 24 December 1996, but failed to make an appearance before his loan expired. Fitzgerald signed for Millwall permanently on 29 July 1997 for a £50,000 fee.

Over the following three seasons, Fitzgerald made 93 appearances and scored one goal, which came with an injury time winner in a 2–1 victory over Wycombe Wanderers on 15 August 1998. Fitzgerald departed the club on 19 October 2000, having lost his place in the team and making only one appearance during the 2000–01 season.

Colchester United
Fitzgerald joined Second Division club Colchester United on 19 October 2000 on a free transfer and remained with the club until the end of the 2003–04 season, when he was released. Over the course of his time with the Us, Fitzgerald made 128 appearances and scored no goals.

Brentford
Fitzgerald joined Second Division club Brentford on loan on 16 March 2004 and played an important role in the Bees' successful battle against relegation in the 2003–04 season. He signed a permanent contract on 11 June 2004, though he featured sparingly during the 2004–05 season. The final appearance of Fitzgerald's career came in the last game of the regular season, playing alongside fellow veteran Andy Myers in central defence during a 2–1 victory over already-promoted Hull City.

Fitzgerald retired at the end of the 2004–05 season, following Brentford's defeat to Sheffield Wednesday in the League One play-off semi-finals. He made 24 appearances during his time with the Bees. Though he had officially retired at the end of the 2004–05 season, Fitzgerald remained on the playing staff on a non-contract basis during 2005–06.

International career
Fitzgerald was a Republic of Ireland B international.

Coaching career 
While still a first team player, Fitzgerald was handed the role of assistant youth team manager of League One club Brentford by first team manager Martin Allen in October 2004. Upon his retirement as a player at the end of the 2004–05 season, he signed a one-year contract to manage the Brentford youth team. He left his role as youth team manager upon being appointed first team manager in November 2006 and departed the club in April 2007.

Fitzgerald was appointed youth team manager at League One club Gillingham in July 2007. He worked in the role for four months before leaving the club in December 2007.

Fitzgerald was named youth team manager at former club Millwall in December 2007. In 2012, Fitzgerald oversaw the transfer of Millwall's youth development system to a Category Two academy. Fitzgerald is currently academy director with the Lions.

Managerial career

Brentford 
Fitzgerald became caretaker manager of League One club Brentford on 18 November 2006, following the sacking of Leroy Rosenior. The position was made permanent on 21 December 2006. Despite a brief improvement in fortunes in February 2007, Brentford were relegated from League One following a 3–1 defeat to Crewe Alexandra on 9 April 2007. Fitzgerald's contract was terminated a day later and he departed the club. Looking back in November 2009, Fitzgerald stated that "the experience has put me off managing a league club again".

Millwall 
On 26 December 2013, Fitzgerald and Development Squad manager Neil Harris were appoint joint-caretaker managers following the sacking of Steve Lomas. Fitzgerald ruled himself out of the running for the manager's job the following day. The pair managed to muster just one point from their three Championship games in charge and returned to their original roles on 6 January 2014, following the appointment of Ian Holloway.

Career statistics

Manager statistics

References

External links

1969 births
Living people
Brentford F.C. managers
Brentford F.C. players
Colchester United F.C. players
Association football defenders
English people of Irish descent
English footballers
Millwall F.C. players
Millwall F.C. non-playing staff
Gillingham F.C. non-playing staff
Footballers from Westminster
Premier League players
Republic of Ireland association footballers
Republic of Ireland under-21 international footballers
Republic of Ireland B international footballers
Wimbledon F.C. players
English football managers